Montreux railway station is the largest of the railway stations serving the municipality of Montreux, in the canton of Vaud, Switzerland.

All of the SBB-CFF-FFS standard gauge passenger trains operating on the Simplon line call at this station, which is also the western terminus of the GoldenPass Line narrow gauge railway lines to Zweisimmen and to Rochers de Naye.

History
Montreux railway station was opened in 1861, when the then Jura–Simplon Railway (JS) opened the Lausanne–Villeneuve section of its standard gauge Simplon railway line to Sion.  This line is now owned and operated by SBB-CFF-FFS.

In 1901, the station became a junction station upon the opening of the first section of the metre gauge Montreux-Oberland Bernois railway (MOB), between Montreux and its higher altitude suburb of Les Avants.  In 1903, the MOB was extended to Montbovon.

In 1909, the Chemin de fer Montreux–Glion opened the Montreux–Glion section of the Montreux–Glion–Rochers-de-Naye railway line rack railway was opened, as an extension of the original  line of Chemin de fer Glion–Rochers-de-Naye, opened in 1892. It is now operated by Transports Montreux–Vevey–Riviera.

Location
The station is on a hillside above the lake.

Access to and from Montreux's main street, Grand Rue, is by escalators, elevators and stairs.  The Rue de la Gare provides access to and from the old town, which is divided from the lake shore by the standard gauge railway tracks.

Layout
The station complex is in many ways a rarity. Montreux is most distinctive for being one of the few stations in the world (and the only station in Switzerland) served by three different track gauges: SBB-CFF-FFS , MOB  and MVR . Its having three gauges is something shared by Gare de Latour-de-Carol-Enveitg in the French Pyrénées.

Second, access from the station building to the railway platforms is from the second floor, not the ground floor, due to the slope of the city, while the service facilities are at ground floor level, and access to the underpass can be found on the first floor.

Apart from these unusual features, the station also lacks a track 2. In the past, the designation track 2 was allocated to a passing loop not equipped with a platform.

The SBB-CFF-FFS serves the main platform with track 1, and also operates track 3, which, together with the MOB tracks 4 (east half) and 5 (western half), serves a centre platform.  Track 4 partially divides that platform in two.

Tracks 6, 7 and 8 serve a further central platform, which is similarly partially divided in two by track 7.  Track 8, operated by the MVR, is situated underneath both a hotel and the MOB/MVR headquarters, known as the GoldenPass Centre.

Whereas tracks 4 and 7 are used by regional traffic to and from Fontanivent, Sonzier and Les Avants, tracks 5 and 6 are for trains to and from Zweisimmen.

Services 
 the following services call at Montreux:

Swiss Federal Railways 
 RegioExpress:

RER Vaud 

Montreux Oberland Bernois Railway 
 GoldenPass Express: daily round-trip to  via .

Transports Montreux–Vevey–Riviera 

PRODES EA 2035 
As part of the strategic development program for rail infrastructure (PRODES), the Confederation and SBB are focusing on customer orientation and economical management of resources.

By 2040, nearly two million people will travel by rail every day, 50% more than today. In rail freight, the Confederation also expects traffic to increase by around 45%. The Swiss rail network will have to continue to meet customer needs: interesting connections, punctual trains, affordable tickets. SBB is committed to the sustainable development of public transport and takes on this responsibility vis-à-vis Switzerland.

Predicted service

Swiss Federal Railways 

 InterCity: 
 IC9: Half-hourly service between Geneva Airport and Brig.
 InterRegio: 
IR95: Half-hourly service between Geneva Airport and St-Maurice.
IR98: Hourly service between Annemasse and Aigle

RER Vaud 
 RER Vaud: 
: Half-hourly service between Grandson and Aigle.

Montreux Oberland Bernois Railway 
 Panorama Express/Regio: 
 Regio:

Transports Montreux–Vevey–Riviera 
 Regio: 

Bus traffic
A total of three VMCV bus stops serve the station:

Vernex-Dessus on motor bus lines 4,5 and 6;
Montreux Gare on motor bus lines 4,5 and 6;
Escalier de la Gare on trolleybus line 1, access via escalators to Grand Boulevard.

See also

Montreux
SBB-CFF-FFS
Montreux-Oberland Bernois
Transports Montreux–Vevey–Riviera

References

External links

Goldenpass Services - official site 
Interactive station plan (Montreux)

Railway stations in the canton of Vaud
Swiss Federal Railways stations
Montreux
Cultural property of national significance in the canton of Vaud
Railway stations in Switzerland opened in 1861